Ilya Olegovich Kutepov (born 29 July 1993) is a Russian professional football player who plays as centre-back. He plays for Torpedo Moscow.

Club career
He made his debut in the Russian Premier League on 10 December 2012 for FC Spartak Moscow in a game against FC Rubin Kazan.

Kutepov left Spartak upon the expiration of his contract on 2 June 2022.

On 1 July 2022, Kutepov signed a contract with Torpedo Moscow for one season with an option for the second year.

International career
He was called up to the senior Russia squad in August 2016 for matches against Turkey and Ghana. He made his debut on 9 October 2016 in a friendly against Costa Rica.

On 11 May 2018, he was included in Russia's extended 2018 FIFA World Cup squad. On 3 June 2018, he was included in the finalized World Cup squad. He started and played every minute of every game as Russia was eliminated in the quarterfinal shoot-out by Croatia.

Career statistics

Club

International
Statistics accurate as of match played 8 October 2020.

Honours
Spartak Moscow
Russian Premier League: 2016-17
Russian Super Cup: 2017
Russia U21
Commonwealth of Independent States Cup:2013

References

External links

1993 births
Sportspeople from Stavropol
Living people
Russia youth international footballers
Russia under-21 international footballers
Russia international footballers
Russian footballers
Association football defenders
FC Spartak Moscow players
FC Spartak-2 Moscow players
FC Torpedo Moscow players
Russian Second League players
Russian First League players
Russian Premier League players
2017 FIFA Confederations Cup players
2018 FIFA World Cup players